Rangers F.C. is a Scottish football club based in Glasgow. They were founded in 1872 and incorporated in 1899, forming the company The Rangers Football Club Ltd.. In 2000, then chairman and owner David Murray floated the club on the stock market which subsequently made the private company into a public limited company (PLC).

In 2012, The Rangers Football Club PLC entered administration and the company's business and assets, including Rangers F.C., Ibrox Stadium and the Rangers Training Centre were bought by Sevco Scotland Ltd. Sevco Scotland Ltd later changed its name to The Rangers Football Club Ltd. The Rangers International Football Club PLC was then formed as a holding company by The Rangers Football Club Ltd, with the latter becoming a wholly owned subsidiary of the former.

Current company overview
The Rangers Football Club Ltd, previously named Sevco Scotland Ltd, is a limited company based in Glasgow. Sevco Scotland Limited was formed in May 2012 to purchase the assets of The Rangers Football Club Plc (which was subsequently renamed RFC 2012 plc), incorporated in 1899, which went out of business and entered liquidation procedures on 14 June 2012. After Sevco purchased the business, goodwill and assets of The Rangers Football Club Plc, including Rangers FC and Ibrox Stadium, several players agreed to have their contracts transferred to the new company. Some players left to join other clubs as free agents since their former employer had been in breach of contract. After an application to transfer the old company's Scottish Premier League membership was rejected, an application to join the Scottish Football League was accepted with the club being placed in the third division. The Rangers Football Club Plc's SFA membership share was transferred to Sevco Scotland Ltd on 27 July 2012. Sevco Scotland Ltd was renamed The Rangers Football Club Ltd on 31 July 2012.

Company history

Prior to incorporation
The football club was formed in 1872 and was operated by the four founders until its incorporation on 27 May 1899. 
When the club was incorporated, a limited company (The Rangers Football Club Ltd) was formed and the club then had legal personality, with directors and liabilities in accordance with the Companies Act.

Minority shareholdings
From the company's formation in 1899, no single shareholder obtained a large enough shareholding to have a majority (and thereby be deemed the owner). From 1963, John Lawrence (Glasgow) Ltd began increasing its shareholding in the company, eventually becoming the largest shareholder with 15%. John Lawrence of John Lawrence (Glasgow) Ltd, became the club's Chairman and served for nearly ten years, retiring in 1973 due to ill health. On Lawrence's death in 1977, his shareholding in the Lawrence Group, and in its business, was transferred to his grandson, Lawrence Marlborough. The following years saw a steady increase in the Lawrence Group's shareholding in the club.

Lawrence Group 
In 1985, the Lawrence Group increased its shareholding in Rangers to a 52% majority, following a deal with then club vice-chairman Jack Gillespie. In November 1988, head of the Lawrence Group, Lawrence Marlborough sold the company for £6 million.

Murray International Holdings
Between 1988 and 2011 Scottish steel magnate David Murray was the owner of Rangers, after he had purchased the company for £6 million, via his company Murray International Holdings.

During the late 1990s Murray increased the club's player transfer budget in an attempt to succeed in both domestic and European football. High-profile players such as Paul Gascoigne and Brian Laudrup joined the club during this time. After Dick Advocaat became manager, Murray again sanctioned some large transfer spending on players such as Tore Andre Flo and Ronald de Boer.
During this time, Murray employed an Employee Benefit Trust scheme to pay players, and other staff at board level, including himself. EBTs have been described as tax avoidance schemes, and allowed Rangers players and employees to pay less tax on what they were paid. Murray denied that any cheating took place with regards to this EBT scheme during his stewardship. HMRC took issue with the scheme and provided Rangers with a bill of £49 million, inclusive of interest and penalties. This was disputed and was ruled upon by three judges at a First Tier Tax Tribunal; the verdict was announced on 20 November 2012, with Rangers winning the appeal. An Upper Tribunal upheld the decision in 2014, but HMRC appealed to the Court of Session. In November 2015, their appeal that the EBT payments made to Rangers employees were undeclared taxable earnings was upheld by all three judges. In July 2017, the Court of Session's ruling was upheld by the UK Supreme Court in a final decision.

Rangers Football Club became a limited company on 27 May 1899 when it was incorporated as The Rangers Football Club Ltd. It continued in this form until the year 2000 when Murray decided to list the company on the stock exchange, making it a public limited company. The name of the company was therefore changed to The Rangers Football Club Plc.

Whyte and The Rangers FC Group

After protracted takeover negotiations with David Murray, the club was bought by Scottish businessman Craig Whyte on 6 May 2011 for £1, through his company Wavetower Limited (subsequently renamed The Rangers FC Group Limited). Although the deal came with stipulations, such as paying off the club's £18m debt to Lloyds Banking Group, and making further investment in the team.  Early into Whyte's reign at the club, doubts and allegations began to surface relating to his business past, most notably a documentary by BBC Scotland that reported Whyte had previously been banned from being a Director of any UK companies.  It was also disclosed that Whyte did not pay the £18m Lloyds debt as stipulated in the takeover deal, but instead secured a £27m deal with ticketing company Ticketus against future season ticket sales, to pay the debt.  Whyte came under intense media pressure, with many journalists claiming he 'purchased the club with fans' money'.  On 13 February 2012 Whyte filed legal papers at the Court of Session giving notice of an intention to appoint Administrators.

On 14 February 2012, The Rangers Football Club Plc, which was subsequently renamed RFC 2012 plc, entered administration over non-payment of £9 million in PAYE and VAT taxes to HM Revenue and Customs. Entering administration meant the team was docked 10 points by the SPL, effectively ending its 2012 Championship challenge. In April 2012, the administrators estimated that the club's total debts could top £134m.

On 25 June 2012, the Crown Office asked Strathclyde Police to investigate the purchase of Rangers and the Club's subsequent financial management during Whyte's tenure.

Liquidation and current ownership
Sevco Scotland Ltd was formed on 29 May 2012 as a means for Charles Green to acquire the assets of Rangers FC. Sevco Scotland Ltd (subsequently renamed The Rangers Football Club Ltd.) was formed to ensure that if the formation of a new company was required in the event of a CVA being rejected, then the club's corporate entity would be a Scottish registered company as it has always been. When the CVA failed the assets of The Rangers Football Club Plc (subsequently renamed RFC 2012 plc) were then sold for £5.5 million. Charles Green also incorporated another company, Sevco 5088 Limited, on 29 March 2012, which lent some money to The Rangers Football Club Ltd in May 2012.

On 14 June 2012, HMRC's formal rejection of the proposed CVA meant that the company would enter the liquidation process. The accountancy firm BDO were appointed to investigate financial mismanagement at the club. On the same day Sevco Scotland Ltd acquired various assets including Ibrox Stadium and Murray Park, as well as intellectual property, goodwill and various contracts.

An application to transfer the Scottish Premier League membership from the 'oldco' to the 'newco' was rejected by a 10–1 vote. Thereafter, an application to the Scottish Football League was successful with Rangers securing associate membership and a place in the 4th tier of Scottish Football, Division 3, for the 2012–13 season. Agreement was reached on the transfer of SFA membership, with the new company accepting a number of conditions relating to the old company. The club also awaits the conclusion of an investigation of alleged rule breaking by use of dual contracts by Rangers over the period 2001 to 2010.

As a result of the liquidation process, the extent to which Rangers can be regarded as a continuation of the club founded in 1872 has been interpreted differently. Rangers Football Club has been described by some in the mainstream media as a "new club", whilst Chief Executive Charles Green has maintained "this is still Rangers", with the SPL chairman Neil Doncaster saying "it is an existing club, even though it's a new company".

On 16 November 2012, a company called Rangers International Football Club plc was formed and listed on the Alternative Investment Market of the London Stock Exchange and became the holding company for The Rangers Football Club Ltd., which, in turn, owns the football club.

Financial performance
As the new company had not filed any accounts (as of 1 July 2012), it was not clear what its performance would be.  Major Scottish banks including Royal Bank of Scotland, reportedly "concerned at the current uncertainty about the club's future and its backers" declined to provide the new company with the corporate banking facilities it needed. Metro Bank was hired instead.

After the administration and relaunch of Rangers, a local Audi dealership terminated a lucrative sponsorship agreement. It was reported that primary sponsor Tennent's would remain with the new company but would renegotiate a new deal.

Rangers made a profit of £9,314,000 in the first 7 months of 2012–13 financial year, mainly due to the release of negative goodwill.

Shareholder history
Towards the end of August 2012, it was reported that Arif Naqvi, chief executive of private equity firm Abraaj Capital, owned just under 18% of The Rangers F.C. Ltd's shares via Blue Pitch Holdings, after having agreed to invest £2m in June 2012. Other investors included Imran Ahmad and Richard Hughes, from Zeus Capital, owning 9.8% each (Hughes has a 6.8% stake in Rangers). Rangers manager Ally McCoist was reported to own a share of about 4.5% with Scottish-based businessman Ian Hart, who was part of the Blue Knights group, also owning a shareholding of 1.3%. The Blue Knights were one of several groups or individuals that had expressed an interest in taking over the club. Other shareholders in the club revealed included Alessandro Celano and Chris Morgan.

After the formation of new holding and listed company for the club: Rangers International F.C. plc (RIFC), it was reported in an AIM announcement on 5 December 2012 that Charles Green owned a 14.9% shareholding in the club, with Newcastle United owner Mike Ashley having an 8.9% stake. Green and Ashley's shares were projected to fall to 8.67% and 5.20% of the share capital of RIFC respectively after the company's flotation on the stock market and acquisition of the entire share capital of the club. Other shareholders, both before and after the flotation, were also revealed including Blue Pitch Holding, Margarita Funds Holding Trust, Craig Mather, Norne Anstalt, Legal & General Investment Management Limited, Insight Investment Management (Global) Limited, Cazenove Capital Management Limited, Hargreave Hale Limited and Artemis Investment Management LLP.

After departing as Chief Executive, Charles Green sold his shareholding to Sandy Easdale, co-owner of McGill's Bus Services. Easdale increased his stake to 4.52% in November 2013, and then to 5.21% in September 2014.  Easdale also holds the voting rights for 20.94% of the company, giving him control of 26.15% of the issued share capital in total.

In October 2014, Mike Ashley increased his shareholding to 8.92%.

Isle of Man-based hedge fund Laxey Partners were revealed to be the new largest shareholder in RIFC in November 2013, and later increased the shareholding to 16.3%.  In September 2014, a share issue raised £3.13m. In December 2014, Laxey sold their shareholding to a group of businessmen made up of Douglas Park and existing shareholders George Letham and George Taylor. In January 2015, former Rangers director Dave King purchased 14.57% of RIFC's shares from Artemis and Milton.

On 23 June 2017, Mike Ashley sold his entire Rangers shareholding to Club 1872 and Julian Wolhardt.

As of November 2020, RIFC have an issued share capital 322,196,912 ordinary shares of 1 penny each in the company, including additional shares offered through a second share issue in September 2018.

Major shareholders (3% or above)

Current Board of Directors

Rangers International Football Club plc
As of 15 January 2021

The Rangers Football Club Ltd
As of 15 January 2021

References

External links
AIM Profile

Rangers F.C.